Eudonia persimilis is a moth in the family Crambidae. It was described by Sasaki in 1991. It is found in Japan (Honshu), China (Heilongjiang, Guangxi, Shaanxi), Taiwan and Russia.

References

Moths described in 1991
Eudonia